Timeline of the COVID-19 pandemic in Uruguay may refer to:

 Timeline of the COVID-19 pandemic in Uruguay (2020)
 Timeline of the COVID-19 pandemic in Uruguay (2021)

Uruguay